"You" is a song by American R&B singer Jesse Powell and appeared on Powell's first two albums, Jesse Powell and 'Bout It.

The song, released as a single in 1999, became the biggest hit of his career, peaking at number two on the Billboard Hot R&B/Hip-Hop Songs chart and at number ten on the Billboard Hot 100.

Music video
The official music video was directed by Steve Wills.

Year-end charts

References

External links
 

1999 songs
1999 singles
Jesse Powell songs
Silas Records singles
Songs written by Jesse Powell
1990s ballads
Contemporary R&B ballads